Oskari Qvick (born 15 December 1997) is a Finnish former professional footballer who played as a midfielder.

Career
Qvick has played for Inter Turku and ÅIFK.

References

1997 births
Living people
Finnish footballers
FC Inter Turku players
Åbo IFK players
Veikkausliiga players
Kakkonen players
Association football midfielders